John Abner Penton (February 10, 1870 – October 17, 1919) was an American football player and coach. Penton attended the University of Virginia, Auburn University, and Johns Hopkins Medical School. He played starting guard on the 1893, 1894, and 1895 Virginia football teams and was captain of the 1893, 1894, and 1895 teams. After he graduated from the University of Virginia, Penton chose to play as a "special student" fullback on the Auburn football team under head coach, his long-time companion, John Heisman in 1897. The first coach at Clemson, Walter Riggs, had in fact played on the team as well. Penton had lived near the Auburn campus his entire life and likely facilitated the Pennsylvania native, Heisman's, move to the campus. Penton then served as the third head football coach at Clemson University for one season in 1898, compiling a record of 3–1 before the program ran out of money.

Head coaching record

References

External links
 

1870 births
1919 deaths
19th-century players of American football
American football fullbacks
American football guards
Auburn Tigers football players
Clemson Tigers football coaches
Virginia Cavaliers football players
All-Southern college football players
People from Coosa County, Alabama
Players of American football from Alabama